Corydoras diphyes is a tropical freshwater fish belonging to the Corydoradinae sub-family of the family Callichthyidae. It originates in inland waters in South America. Corydoras diphyes is restricted to tributaries of the río Monday and the río Acaray, and right bank tributaries of the río Paraná in Paraguay.

References

Corydoras
Catfish of South America
Fish of Paraguay
Taxa named by Thomas Erik Axenrot
Taxa named by Sven O. Kullander
Fish described in 2003